Starodevichye is a rural locality (a village) in Lipovskoye Rural Settlement, Kirillovsky District, Vologda Oblast, Russia. The population was 158 as of 2002.

Geography 
Starodevichye is located 45 km northeast of Kirillov (the district's administrative centre) by road. Rogovskaya is the nearest rural locality.

References 

Rural localities in Kirillovsky District